The inauguration of Rutherford B. Hayes as the 19th president of the United States took place publicly on Monday, March 5, 1877, at the East Portico of the United States Capitol in Washington, D.C. This was the 23rd inauguration and marked the commencement of the only four-year term of Rutherford B. Hayes as president and William A. Wheeler as vice president.

As March 4, 1877, fell on a Sunday, Hayes was sworn in at the Red Room of the White House on March 3, becoming the first president to take the presidential oath of office in the White House. This ceremony was held in secret under tight security, as the previous year's election had been so bitterly divisive to the point that outgoing President Grant feared an insurrection by Samuel J. Tilden's supporters, while assuring any Democratic Party attempt to hijack a public inauguration ceremony would fail.

Having been sworn in already in private, Hayes took the oath again publicly two days later, and served until March 4, 1881. Hayes' best known quotation, "He serves his party best who serves his country best," is from his inaugural address. Hayes became the first president not to invoke God or a supreme being in his inaugural address.

See also
Presidency of Rutherford B. Hayes
1876 United States presidential election

Notes

External links

Inauguration of Rutherford B. Hayes at the Library of Congress
Our Campaigns.com coverage of the Hayes Inauguration
 Text of Hayes' Inaugural Address

United States presidential inaugurations
1877 in American politics
1877 in Washington, D.C.
Inauguration
March 1877 events